Austrolebias is a genus of killifish in the family Rivulidae. These annual killifish live in temporary pools, swamps and streams in the Río de la Plata, Patos–Mirim and Mamoré basins in South America.

Species
There are currently 46 recognized species in this genus:

References

 
Rivulidae
Freshwater fish genera